Castañedo is one of 28 parishes (administrative divisions) in the municipality of Grado, within the province and autonomous community of Asturias, in northern Spain.

The population is 251 (INE 2007).

Villages and hamlets
 Barrio Azul
 El Bravuco
 Bustiello
 Cadenado
 Campo del Cura
 Casas de Abajo
 Foyaca
 La Matiega
 La Quintana
 Molinos de Agosto
 Morana
 Picaroso
 Terrero
 Vistalegre

References

Parishes in Grado